Malmfälten is a major mining district in Sweden, centred on the northern towns of Kiruna and Malmberget.

See also
LKAB
Bergslagen
Boliden
Iron Range in Minnesota

Geography of Norrbotten County
Industry in the Arctic